Greenberg's conjecture is either of two conjectures in algebraic number theory proposed by Ralph Greenberg. Both are still unsolved as of 2021.

Invariants conjecture
The first conjecture was proposed in 1976 and concerns Iwasawa invariants. This conjecture is related to Vandiver's conjecture, Leopoldt's conjecture, Birch–Tate conjecture, all of which are also unsolved.

If  is totally real, is the power of  dividing the class number of  bounded as  ?

Simply speaking, the conjecture asks whether we have  for any totally real number field  and any prime number , or the conjecture can also be reformulated as asking whether both invariants λ and µ associated to the cyclotomic -extension of a totally real number field vanish.

In 2001, Greenberg generalized the conjecture (thus making it known as Greenberg's pseudo-null conjecture or, sometimes, as Greenberg's generalized conjecture):

Then  is a pseudo-null -module.

 
Another related conjecture (also unsolved as of yet) exists:

We have  for any number field  and any prime number .

This related conjecture was justified by Bruce Ferrero and Larry Washington, both of whom proved (see: Ferrero–Washington theorem) that  for any abelian extension  of the rational number field  and any prime number .

p-rationality conjecture
Another conjecture, which can be referred to as Greenberg's conjecture, was proposed by Greenberg in 2016, and is known as Greenberg's -rationality conjecture. It states that for any odd prime  and for any , there exists a -rational field  such that . This conjecture is related to the Inverse Galois problem.

Further reading
R. Greenberg, On some questions concerning the lwasawa invariants, Princeton University thesis (1971)
R. Greenberg, "On the lwasawa invariants of totally real number fields", American Journal of Mathematics, issue 98 (1976), pp. 263–284
R. Greenberg, "Iwasawa Theory — Past and Present", Advanced Studies in Pure Mathematics, issue 30 (2001), pp. 335–385
R. Greenberg, "Galois representations with open image", Annales mathématiques du Québec, volume 40, number 1 (2016), pp. 83–119
B. Ferrero and L. C. Washington, "The Iwasawa Invariant  Vanishes for Abelian Number Fields", Annals of Mathematics (Second Series), volume 109, number 2 (May, 1979), pp. 377–395

Algebraic number theory
Conjectures
Unsolved problems in number theory